Panamanian cuisine is a mix of African, Spanish, and Native American techniques, dishes, and ingredients, reflecting its diverse population. Since Panama is a land bridge between two continents, it has a large variety of tropical fruits, vegetables and herbs that are used in native cooking.

Common ingredients in Panamanian food are maize, rice, wheat flour, plantains, yuca (cassava), beef, chicken, pork and seafood.

Dishes 

Corn-based dishes come from the kernel, cooked in water and then ground in order to obtain a dough (as opposed to using corn flour to obtain the dough). Fresh corn is also used in some dishes. Due to the multicultural background of the Panamanians, many of its dishes are heavily influenced by the cuisine of other Latin American countries and also the Caribbean as well as European. Some of the main meals, dishes and specialties include:
 Almojábanos – "S" shaped corn fritters.
 Arroz con camarones y coco – rice with shrimp and coconut milk.
 Arroz con chorizo y ajíes dulces 
 Arroz con pollo
 Arroz con puerco y vegetales
 Arroz verde
 Bistec de higado – liver steak
 Bistec picado – chopped beefsteak.
 Bollos – corn dough wrapped in nahuala palm leaves, corn husk or plantain leaves and boiled. There are two main varieties: fresh corn bollos (bollos de maíz nuevo) and dry corn bollos. The dry corn type is sometimes flavored with butter, corn, or stuffed with beef, which is called bollo "preñado" (lit. "pregnant bollo"). Bollos have been described as a type of tamale.
 Carne entomatada
 Carimañola – similar to an empanada, but made from yuca and stuffed with beef
 Ceviche – commonly made from corvina and tilapia
 Chorizo con vegetales 
 Chuletas en salsa de piña
 Empanadas – made either from flour or corn, and stuffed with meats and/or vegetables, cheese, and sometimes sweet fillings, such as fruit marmalade or manjar blanco (dulce de leche).
 Ensalada de papas – potato salad, called ensalada de feria when beetroot is added.
 Fried fish
 Gaucho soup
 Hojaldres/Hojaldras – a type of fry-bread, similar to South American countries, known in other countries as "blach tostones".
 Lengua guisada – stewed beef tongue
 Mondongo a la culona – stewed beef tripe
 Palm tree flower – prepared like spaghetti
 Pernil de puerco al horno – roasted pork leg
 Plátano en tentacion – ripe plantain cooked in a sweet syrup.
 Ropa vieja
 Salpicón de carne

 Sancocho
 Tamal de olla
 Tamales
 Tortillas – these can be around ten to twelve inches in diameter (these are always cooked on a griddle), or smaller, around four inches (most of the time these are fried).
 Torrejitas (Pastelitos) de maíz – A fresh corn fritter.
 Tortilla Changa – a thick tortilla made out of fresh corn.
 Tasajo – dried, sometimes smoked meat, usually from beef though the word refers mainly to the mode of curing rather than the type of meat.

Desserts 

 Bocadillo – Hardened square milk candies.
 Bocado de la reina
 Bolitas de tamarindo – Sugar balls with tamarind fruit.
 Cabanga
 Cocadas 
 Cocadas – Coconut rolled candy made from condensed milk.
 Dulce de papaya
 Flan – Rimmed pastry or sponge base containing a sweet or savoury filling.
 Gollería – sweetened plantain fritter
 Huevitos de leche- Balls of milk candy
 Mamallena
 Manjar or manjar blanco
 Mazamorra or pesada de nance
 Meringue – Whipped eggs and sugar baked.
Orejitas – Ear shaped sugar coated flour.
 Queque
 Seasonal pineapple – grown in Panama using a hybrid of Hawaiian pineapple, it is very sweet
 Sopa borracha 
 Suspiros – Wafers made from flour that release air when you bite.
 Tres leches

Drinks 

In Panama there were bars that catered to local businessmen, tourists and gamblers and some that were frequented by US military personnel. The latter mostly had a reputation as "shot and beer" dives with unknown names. One of these bars, Kresch's Place published a drink recipe book. Several of the drinks are named after bases, submarines, forts, ships and other military institutions. The "U.S.S. 44 Special" was Old Tom gin, sloe gin and lime juice. The U.S.S. Mallard was aged rum (Panamanian, Venezuelan and Colombian), red vermouth, Bénédictine, absinthe, Angostura bitters garnished with lemon peel. The cover of the recipe book shows soldiers, sailors and an Army officer drinking.

 Beer
 Chicha
 Chicheme
 Coffee
 Fresh fruit juices (licuados or jugos naturales) – pineapple, passionfruit, papaya, orange, tree tomato, etc. are prepared by blending fresh fruit and straining; typically heavily sweetened and optionally with condensed milk added
 Malteada – a malted eskimo-like milkshake without ice cream
 Resbaladera
 Ron ponche<ref name="García"
 Saril – a drink containing sorrel sepals, ginger, cinnamon, cloves, sugar, water, and a splash of rum)
 Seco Herrerano

Spices
 Achiote – common in Panamanian cuisine
 Aji chombo – a hot pepper grown in local regions

Special occasions

Christmas 
The traditional Panamanian dish for Christmas usually includes chicken tamales, arroz con pollo (rice with chicken), puerco asado, pernil, pavo (turkey), and relleno (stuffing). Bowls of fruits and fruitcake are set out on the tables along with the dishes. Along with these foods and dessert, a traditional drink is served called Ron Ponche (eggnog), and different recipes are available. An easy one consists of two cans of condensed milk, three cans of evaporated milk, six eggs, and a half a bottle of rum and nutmeg for some extra flavor.

See also

References

Further reading

External links